Wang Film Productions Co., Ltd. (also known as Hong Guang Animation (宏廣) and Cuckoos' Nest Studio) is one of the oldest and most prolific Taiwanese-American animation studios since 1978. The company, based in Xindian, Taipei and Los Angeles, California, has done traditional hand-drawn 2D animation/ink and paint for various TV shows and films for studios across North America, Europe and Asia-Pacific.

History 
Wang Film/Cuckoo's Nest, the studio's original name, was founded by James C.Y. Wang (王中元)/Wang Zhongyuan, Hsu Chih-wei and Lu Kuang-chi started the studio in 1978 as a Taiwanese subcontractor for various Japanese animation studios and also an overseas facility for the American animation studio Hanna–Barbera. Hanna-Barbera sent Jerry Smith to help set up the company and eventually owned half the company. Many employees from Chunghwa Cartoon came to work at Cuckoo's Nest Studio along with employees from Ying Ren Cartoon and Shang Shang. Don Patterson was brought on board as a trainer. The company started with about 50 employees but soon had 300.

In the company's first year, 17 episodes were produced for Hanna-Barbera. Quickly, they had contracts with Disney, Warner Bros., and Universal.

With increased wages and foreign exchange rates, Cuckoo's was being priced out of the outsourcing market. Thus the CNS began restructuring. A Chinese subsidiary of Cuckoo's Nest Studio known as Speedy Victory Animation Co., Ltd. was opened in 1987 in Zhuhai, southern Guangdong province in order to receive works from Japan. In 1991, Cuckoo's Nest had to lay off 200 employees in Taipei. The company began computerization to reduced cost, while training some that would have been laid off to operate the computers. By 1993, the company had capacity to produce 200 half hour episodes each year. In 1993, a Shanghai unit, possibly a joint venture with the state-run Shanghai Animation Film Studio, was under consideration with Bangkok as an alternative. Also, internal developed and produced material was expected to start hitting the market in mid-1994.

In early 1991, Hanna-Barbera sold its digital ink and paint software to the company which was developed by Marc Levoy.

The company is also notable for their work on the overseas production for Nelvana's Care Bears franchise, Film Roman's Garfield and Friends and Bobby's World, Klasky Csupo's Rugrats pilot and first season, Disney's DuckTales and Stretch Films' Courage the Cowardly Dog. They also helped produce effects for the 1982 film Tron and some Peanuts television specials, production ink & paint matting, and animation assistance.

Filmography

TV series 
Outsourced from Hanna-Barbera
 The 13 Ghosts of Scooby-Doo (1985–1986, uncredited) - 13 half-hour episodes: To All the Ghouls I've Loved Before, Scoobra Kadoobra, Me and My Shadow Demon, Reflections in a Ghoulish Eye, That's Monstertainment, Ship of Ghouls, A Spooky Little Ghoul Like You, When You Witch Upon a Star, It's a Wonderful Scoob, Scooby in Kwackyland, Coast-to-Ghost, The Ghouliest Show on Earth and Horror-Scope Scoob
 2 Stupid Dogs
 Bill & Ted's Excellent Adventures (Season 1)
 The Biskitts
 Captain Caveman and the Teen Angels (1977–1980, uncredited)
 Capitol Critters
 Challenge of the GoBots
 The Completely Mental Misadventures of Ed Grimley
 Courage the Cowardly Dog (1999–2002)
 The Dukes (1983, uncredited)
 The Flintstone Kids (1986–1988)
 The Fonz and the Happy Days Gang (1980–1982, uncredited)
 Foofur (1986-1988)
 Fred and Barney Meet the Thing (uncredited)
 The Further Adventures of SuperTed (1989)
 Galtar and the Golden Lance (1985–1987)
 The Godzilla Power Hour (uncredited)
 Gravedale High (1990–1991)
 The Greatest Adventure: Stories from the Bible (1985–1993, direct-to-video series)
 The Jetsons (1980s revival, 1985 episodes only, uncredited)
 Laff-A-Lympics (Season 2, uncredited)
 Laverne and Shirley in the Army (1981-1982, uncredited)
 The New Adventures of Jonny Quest
 Pac-Man (1983; uncredited)
 Paw Paws (1985–1986, uncredited)
 The Pirates of Dark Water
 Police Academy: The Animated Series
 Popeye and Son (1987–1988)
Pound Puppies
 A Pup Named Scooby-Doo (1988–1991)
 Shirt Tales (uncredited)
 The Smurfs (Animation production shared with Toei Animation on some episodes during season 6–8)
 Snorks (1984–1989)
 The Super Powers Team: Galactic Guardians (1985)
 Timeless Tales from Hallmark (direct to video series, 1990)
 Tom & Jerry Kids (1990–1993)
 Yo Yogi! (1991–1992)
 Yogi's Treasure Hunt (1985–1987)
 What a Cartoon! (some shorts)
 Wildfire (1986–1987)

Outsourced from Disney Television Animation

Outsourced from Warner Bros. Animation

Outsourced from other studios

 Television films and specials 
 The Betty Boop Movie Mystery (1989) (co-produced by King Features)
 The Bug Hunt (1996, Disney Television Animation)
 Care Bears Nutcracker Suite (1988, Nelvana and Telefilm Canada)
 Cartoon All-Stars to the Rescue (1990) (co-produced by Southern Star Productions)
 Christmas in Tattertown (1988, Nickelodeon)
 Dieter: Der Film (2000, TFC Trickompany)
 The Flintstone Kids' "Just Say No" Special (1988, Hanna-Barbera Productions)
 Garfield's Feline Fantasies and Garfield Gets a Life (1990, 1991, Film Roman, United Media and PAWS, Inc.)
 Hägar the Horrible: Hägar Knows Best (1989, Hanna-Barbera Productions)
 Hanna-Barbera Superstars 10 TV movies (1987–1988, Hanna-Barbera Productions)
 Peanuts (three specials, Snoopy's Reunion, It's Christmastime Again, Charlie Brown & You're in the Super Bowl, Charlie Brown, 1991, 1992, 1994)
 Scooby-Doo in Arabian Nights (1994, Hanna-Barbera Productions)
 Tiny Toon Spring Break (1994, Warner Bros. Animation and Amblin Entertainment)
 The Town Santa Forgot (1993, Hanna-Barbera Productions)
 The Wind in the Willows (1987, Rankin/Bass Productions)
 Yogi Bear's All Star Comedy Christmas Caper (1982, Hanna-Barbera Productions)

 Feature films 
Original productions
 Uncle Niou's Great Adventure (1982)
 Doraemon Robot Wars (1983)
 Funky Space Monkey Fire Ball (2005)
 Lin Wang (2018) (currently in production) 

Outsourced productions
 The Adventures of Brer Rabbit (2006, Universal Animation Studios)
 Aladdin (1992, Walt Disney Animation Studios)
 An All Dogs Christmas Carol (1998, Metro-Goldwyn-Mayer Animation)
 All Dogs Go to Heaven 2 (1996, Metro-Goldwyn-Mayer Animation)
 Annabelle's Wish (1997, Ralph Edwards Productions)
 Babes in Toyland (1997, Metro-Goldwyn-Mayer Animation)
 Balto II: Wolf Quest (2002, Universal Animation Studios)
 Balto III: Wings of Change (2004, Universal Animation Studios)
 Beauty and the Beast: The Enchanted Christmas (1997, Disneytoon Studios and Disney Television Animation)
 Bebe's Kids (1992, Hyperion Pictures)
 Bionicle: Mask of Light (2003, Lego, Miramax Films, Buena Vista, Create TV & Film, and Creative Capers Entertainment)
 Bionicle 2: Legends of Metru Nui (2004, Lego, Miramax Films, Buena Vista, Create TV & Film, and Creative Capers Entertainment)
 Bionicle 3: Web of Shadows (2005, Lego, Miramax Films, Buena Vista, Create TV & Film, and Creative Capers Entertainment)
 The Brave Little Toaster (1987, Hyperion Animation and Atlantic/Kushner-Locke)
 Candy Land: The Great Lollipop Adventure (2005, Hasbro Entertainment and SD Entertainment)
 The Care Bears Adventure in Wonderland (1987, Nelvana)
 The Care Bears Movie (1985, Nelvana)
 Care Bears Movie II: A New Generation (1986, Nelvana)
 Charlotte's Web 2: Wilbur's Great Adventure (2003, Paramount Pictures, Universal Animation Studios and Nickelodeon)
 Curious George (2006, Universal Animation Studios)
 The Emperor's New Groove (2000, Walt Disney Animation Studios)
 Felidae (1994, TFC Trickompany, Animationstudio Ludewig, Uli Meyer Animation and Natterjack Animation)
 FernGully: The Last Rainforest (1992, Kroyer Films, Youngheart Productions and FAI Films)
 FernGully 2: The Magical Rescue (1998, WildBrain)
 GoBots: Battle of the Rock Lords (1986, Hanna-Barbera Productions and Tonka)
 Hercules: Zero to Hero (1999, Disneytoon Studios and Disney Television Animation)
 Holly Hobbie and Friends: Surprise Party (2005, Nickelodeon Animation Studio)
 Holly Hobbie and Friends: Christmas Wishes (2006, Nickelodeon Animation Studio)
 Holly Hobbie and Friends: Best Friends Forever (2007, Nickelodeon Animation Studio)
 How to Hook Up Your Home Theater (2007, Walt Disney Animation Studios)
 Jetsons: The Movie (1990, Hanna-Barbera Productions)
 Joseph: King of Dreams (2000, DreamWorks Animation LLC)
  (1997, TFC Trickompany Filmproduktion GmbH)
 The Land Before Time (films VII–XIII) (2000–2007, Universal Animation Studios)
 The Lion King (1994, Walt Disney Animation Studios)
 Leroy & Stitch (2006, Disney Television Animation)
 Lilo & Stitch (2002, Walt Disney Animation Studios)
 The Little Mermaid (1989, Walt Disney Animation Studios)
 The Little Mermaid II: Return to the Sea (2000, Disneytoon Studios and Disney Television Animation)
 Mickey Mouse Clubhouse: Mickey's Monster Musical (2015, Disney Television Animation)
 Mulan (1998, Walt Disney Animation Studios)
 Mulan II (2005, Disneytoon Studios)
 My Little Pony: A Charming Birthday (2003, SD Entertainment)
 My Little Pony: Dancing in the Clouds (2004, SD Entertainment)
 My Little Pony: Friends are Never Far Away (2005, SD Entertainment)
 My Little Pony: A Very Minty Christmas (2005, Hasbro Entertainment and SD Entertainment)
 My Little Pony Crystal Princess: The Runaway Rainbow (2006, SD Entertainment)
 My Little Pony: A Very Pony Place (2007, SD Entertainment)
 My Little Pony: Twinkle Wish Adventure (2009, SD Entertainment)
 My Scene Goes Hollywood (2005, Miramax Family)
 Once Upon a Forest (1993, Hanna-Barbera Productions and Harlech Television Cymru/Wales)
 The Pagemaster (1994, Turner Feature Animation)
 Phineas and Ferb Decology (2009–2015) (with Synergy Animation)
 Phineas and Ferb's Musical Cliptastic Countdown (2009, Disney Television Animation)
 Phineas and Ferb Christmas Vacation (2009, Disney Television Animation)
 Phineas and Ferb's Musical Cliptastic Countdown Hosted by Kelly Osbourne (2013, Disney Television Animation)
 Phineas and Ferb: Mission Marvel (2013, Disney Television Animation)
 Phineas and Ferb Save Summer (2014, Disney Television Animation)
 Phineas and Ferb: Star Wars (2014, Disney Television Animation)
 Phineas and Ferb: Night of the Living Pharmacists (2014, Disney Television Animation)
 Tales from the Resistance: Back to the 2nd Dimension (2014, Disney Television Animation)
 Phineas and Ferb: Last Day of Summer (2014, Disney Television Animation)
 Phineas and Ferb: The O.W.C.A. Files (2015, Disney Television Animation)
 Phineas and Ferb the Movie: Across the 2nd Dimension (2011, Disney Television Animation) (A Disney Channel Original Movie)
 Pippi Longstocking (1997, Nelvana)
 Pound Puppies and the Legend of Big Paw (1988, Carolco Pictures, Atlantic/Kushler-Locke and The Maltese)
 The Prince and the Pauper (1990, Walt Disney Animation Studios)
 The Pumpkin of Nyefar (2004)
 Rover Dangerfield (1991, Hyperion Pictures)
 The Secret of NIMH 2: Timmy to the Rescue (1998, Metro-Goldwyn-Mayer Animation)
 Scooby-Doo! and the Monster of Mexico (2003, Warner Bros. Animation)
 Tarzan & Jane (2002, Disney Television Animation)
 Tarzan (1999, Walt Disney Animation Studios)
 The Thief and the Cobbler (1995, Richard Williams Productions, Fred Calvert Productions and Allied Filmmakers)
 Tom and Jerry: The Movie (1992, Turner Entertainment, Film Roman, and WMG)
 Tom Sawyer (2000, Metro-Goldwyn-Mayer Animation)
 Tron (1982, Walt Disney Productions and Lisberger Studios)
 Winnie the Pooh: A Very Merry Pooh Year (2002, Disneytoon Studios)
 Winnie the Pooh: Seasons of Giving (1999, Disneytoon Studios)
 Yu Yu Hakusho: Fight for the Netherworld (1994, Pierrot)
 Yu Yu Hakusho: The Movie (1993, Pierrot)
 Zu Warriors from the Magic Mountain (1983, Paragon Films)

 Others 
 MGM Sing Alongs (1997)

 CGCG 

CGCG, Inc. is a computer-animation studio that is a division of Wang Film Productions Co., Ltd..

 Productions 
CGCG (Taiwan)

CGCG (China)

CGCG Studio (Japan)

 Thai Wang Film Productions 

Thai Wang Film Productions Co., Ltd. is a division of Wang Film Productions located in Bangkok, Thailand.

 Productions 
 Goof Troop (1992) - ink & paint for 6 episodes
 The Thief and the Cobbler (1993, Richard Williams Productions, Fred Calvert Productions and Allied Filmmakers)
 Gargoyles (1994) - "Awakening, Part 2"
 Gargoyles the Movie: The Heroes Awaken (1995) (as Thai Wang Production)
 Timon & Pumbaa (1995–1996)
 Road Rovers (1996)
 Boo to You Too! Winnie the Pooh (1996, Disney Television Animation) (as Thai Wang Film Production Co., Ltd.)
 All Dogs Go to Heaven: The Series (1996–1998)
 Quack Pack (1996) - 2 episodes
 Jungle Cubs (1996)
  (1997, TFC Trickompany Filmproduktion GmbH)
 101 Dalmatians: The Series (1997–1998) - 13 episodes
 Babes in Toyland  (1997, Metro-Goldwyn-Mayer Animation)
 The Adventures of Paddington Bear (1997, CINAR Animation)
 Belle's Magical World (1998, DisneyToon Studios) (as Thai Wang Film Production Co., Ltd.)
 Hercules: The Animated Series (1998) - 5 episodes
 An All Dogs Christmas Carol (1998, Metro-Goldwyn-Mayer Animation)
 Max und Moritz (1999)
 Hercules: Zero to Hero (1999, Disney Television Animation) (as Thai Wang Film Production)
 Detention (1999)
 Dragon Tales (1999) (Season 1)
 Courage the Cowardly Dog (1999)
 Poochini's Yard (2000)
 Heavy Metal 2000 (2000)
 Buzz Lightyear of Star Command (2000)
 What's New, Scooby-Doo? (2002)
 Franklin's Magic Christmas (2001, Nelvana)
 Back to School with Franklin (2003, Nelvana)
 Stuart Little: The Animated Series (2003, Sony Pictures Television and Adelaide Productions)
 The Pumpkin of Nyefar (2004)
 Leroy & Stitch (2006, Disney Television Animation; Digital Production)

 Hong Guang Animation (Suzhou) 

Hong Guang Animation (Suzhou) Co., Ltd. is a division of Wang Film Productions located in Suzhou, Jiangsu, China.

 Productions 
 Benjamin Blümchen Bibi Blocksberg Kangoo (Season 2)
 The Adventures of Paddington Bear (1997–2001)
 Loggerheads (1997)
 Princess Sissi (1997–1998)
 Dumb Bunnies (1998–1999)
 Mythic Warriors (1998–2000)
 The Lionhearts (1998)
 George and Martha (1999–2000)
 Rescue Heroes (1999–2000) (Season 1)
 Little Bear (1999–2003) (Season 5)
 Marvin the Tap-Dancing Horse (2000–2002)
 Nick & Perry (2000–2001)
 Timothy Tweedle: The First Christmas Elf (2000, Evening Sky)
 Sagwa, the Chinese Siamese Cat (2001–2002, as Cuckoo's Nest)
 Gadget and the Gadgetinis (2002–2003)
 Fillmore! (2002)
 My Little Pony: A Charming Birthday (2003, SD Entertainment)
 Winx Club (2004) (Season 1)
 Altair in Starland (2004)
 Zeroman (2004)
 My Little Pony: Dancing in the Clouds (2004, SD Entertainment)
 Candy Land: The Great Lollipop Adventure (2005, SD Entertainment)
 My Little Pony: Friends are Never Far Away (2005, SD Entertainment)
 My Little Pony: A Very Minty Christmas (2005, Hasbro and SD Entertainment)
 Asterix and the Vikings (2006)
 Forest Friends (2006–2007)
 My Little Pony Crystal Princess: The Runaway Rainbow (2006, SD Entertainment)
 My Little Pony: A Very Pony Place (2007, SD Entertainment)
 Care Bears: Adventures in Care-a-lot (2007–2008)
 Ni Hao, Kai-Lan (2007–2008) (Season 1)
 Tutenstein: Clash of the Pharaohs (2008)
 My Little Pony: Twinkle Wish Adventure'' (2009, SD Entertainment)

See also 
 List of animation studios
 List of companies of Taiwan
 List of companies of Thailand

References

External links 
 Official website
 Official CGCG Studio website
 

Taiwanese animation studios
Chinese animation studios
Mass media companies established in 1978
1978 establishments in Taiwan
Companies based in Taipei
Companies based in Bangkok
Companies based in Suzhou
Entertainment companies established in 1978
Entertainment companies of Taiwan
Chinese companies established in 1990